The prix du meilleur jeune économiste de France (lit. Best Young Economist of France Award) is an annual award given since 2000 by daily newspaper Le Monde and the Cercle des économistes to French economists under the age of 40.

Recipients

See also

 List of economics awards
John Bates Clark Medal
Gossen Prize
Yrjö Jahnsson Award
Nakahara Prize
Assar Lindbeck Medal

References

Economics awards
French awards
Awards established in 2000
Early career awards